Fractional dose vaccination is a strategy to reduce the dose of a vaccine to achieve a vaccination policy goal that is more difficult to achieve with conventional vaccination approaches, including deploying a vaccine faster in a pandemic, reaching more individuals in the setting of limited healthcare budgets, or minimizing side effects due to the vaccine.

Fractional dose vaccination exploits the nonlinear dose-response characteristics of a vaccine: If two persons can be vaccinated instead of one, but each one gets 2/3 of the protective efficacy, there is a net benefit at society scale for reducing the number of infections. If the healthcare budget is limited or only a limited amount of vaccine is available during the early phase of a pandemic, this can make a difference for the total number of infections.

Fractional dose vaccination uses a fraction of the standard dose of a regular vaccine that is administered by the same, or an alternative route (often subcutaneously or intradermally).

Fractional dose vaccination has been used or proposed in a number of relevant infectious poverty diseases including yellow fever, poliomyelitis, COVID-19.

Use

In the context of limited healthcare budgets 
During the 2016 yellow fever outbreak in Angola and the Democratic Republic of the Congo, the WHO approved the use of fractional dose vaccination to deal with a potential shortage of vaccine. In August 2016, a large vaccination campaign in Kinshasa used 1/5 of the standard vaccine dose. In 2018 it was reported that fractional dose vaccination with 1/5 of the standard vaccine dose, administered intradermally, conferred protection for 10 years, as documented by a randomized clinical trial.

In Poliomyelitis, fractional dose vaccination has been shown to be effective while reducing overall cost, rendering polio vaccination available to more individuals.

In the Covid-19 pandemic 
In a pandemic wave, fractional dose vaccination is considered to accelerate widespread access to vaccination when vaccine supply is limited:

In the COVID-19 pandemic, epidemiologic models predict a major benefit of personalized fractional dose vaccination strategies with certain vaccines in terms of case load, deaths, and shortening of the pandemic.

To reduce side effects
In some segments of the population, disease risk is lower but specific vaccine side effect risks may be increased. In such subpopulations, fractional dose vaccination might optimize the benefit-risk ratio of vaccination for an individuum and optimize the cost-benefit relation for society.

References 

Vaccination